Abbott School can refer to a number of different places:

The Abbott School, a school on the grounds of the Abbott House orphanage in Irvington, New York
Abbott Street School, in Worcester, Massachusetts
Abbott Middle School, in Elgin, Illinois
Abbott High School, in Abbott, Texas
Abbott Independent School District, in Abbott, Texas
Henry Abbott Technical High School, in Danbury, Connecticut
Abbott District, a special type of school district in the state of New Jersey